The American Center for Mobility (ACM) is a  vehicular automation research center and federally designated automated vehicle proving ground located in Ypsilanti Township, Michigan.

History 
Founded in December 2017 on the site of the Willow Run manufacturing complex, the American Center for Mobility began as a joint initiative of the State of Michigan, partnering with Ann Arbor SPARK, Business Leaders for Michigan, the Michigan Department of Transportation, the Michigan Economic Development Corporation, the University of Michigan, and Ypsilanti Township as a way of accelerating autonomous vehicle research regionally and nationally.

Portions of the US Highway 12 alignment and ramps to the former manufacturing complex were repurposed for creation of a test track. Additional roadways and connections were constructed on the site of the complex.

Features 
The test track includes a  curved tunnel,  highway loop, an off-road course, two double overpasses, along with various intersections and roundabouts. The track is branded as "Powered by Intertek" as Intertek serves as operations and maintenance partner. 

In January of 2020 ACM opened its Technology Park, designed to serve as an incubation hub for startups and offices onsite for partners, as well as event and demonstration space.  

In addition to the test track and research center in Ypsilanti, ACM also operates the Detroit Smart Parking Center in Detroit in partnership with Ford, Bedrock, and Bosch.

References

Road test tracks
2017 establishments in Michigan
Self-driving cars